is a 1960 Japanese film directed by Mikio Naruse.

Plot
Sanae, a recent widow and the eldest daughter of a family, returns to her mother, eldest brother and his brother's wife. The family argues over what to do with the money Sanae's husband left her.

Cast
Setsuko Hara as Sanae Sakanoshi, the eldest daughter
Masayuki Mori as Yuichiro Sakanishi, the eldest son
Hideko Takamine as Kazuko Sakanishi, Yuichiro's wife
Reiko Dan as Haruko Sakanishi, the third daughter
Mitsuko Kusabue as Kaoru Sakanishi, the second daughter
Aiko Mimasu as Aki Sakanishi, the mother
Akira Takarada as Reiji Sakanishi, the younger son

Release
Daughters, Wives and a Mother received a roadshow theatrical release at the Yūraku-za Theatre in Tokyo, Japan on 21 May 1960. It was the first Japanese film to play at the theatre since World War II. It received a general release on 28 May 1960.  The film was Toho's highest-grossing film production of 1960 and the eighth highest-grossing Japanese production of 1960. It was released in the United States with English subtitles by Toho International on December 1, 1978.

References

External links
 
 

1960 films
Films directed by Mikio Naruse
1960s Japanese-language films
Toho films
1960s Japanese films